A Peculiar People: The Church as Culture in a Post-Christian Society (1996) is a book by Rodney Clapp discussing the Christian church's witness in contemporary culture.

In the book Clapp explores the changing role of the Christian church in light of a changing North American culture. Clapp argues against a church that has been co-opted by the larger culture. As such he argues that the church should stand as a unique or peculiar culture that can then critique the larger culture.

A contingent aspect of this that Clapp argues for is the notion that the church needs to shift its understand of itself from a collection of individuals each with their own understanding, ideas, and values. For the church to be culture it must be understood as community.

Clapp argues that the church should be transformative in the world via living as an alternative culture rather than through political means. In essence his position is that by living a unique form of life in the world the church can bear witness to another way, and in bearing witness it can bring positive change to the larger culture.

1996 non-fiction books
Books about Christianity